Bombay Poets (or, Bombay School of Poets) was one of the founding school of poets of Indian English literature of the post-independence era, consisting of both prose and verse. It was located in the geographical located in Bombay (now, Mumbai). Several members of the same are credited with redefining Indian English poetry as well as the perception of Indian poets abroad. The school began in the 1960s with prominent names like Nissim Ezekiel, R. Parthasarathy, Dom Moraes, Adil Jussawalla and many more gathering at Kala Ghoda where they would all sit and discuss about literature, present their own works & critically analyse others work. Due to their international acclaim, they have also performed their works at cultural capitals like Soho (in London), New York, and many more of such places. Their selected works have also been achieved at the Cornell University Library.

Their works remain largely influential till date in India, and have inspired many generations of authors & poets.

List of Bombay Poets 
 Nissim Ezekiel
 R. Parthasarathy
 Dom Moraes
 Adil Jussawalla
 Arvind Krishna Mehrotra
 Dilip Chitre
 Gieve Patel
 Ranjit Hoskote
 Eunice de Souza
 Jerry Pinto
 Annie Zaidi
 Arun Kolatkar
 Santan Rodrigues
 Rochelle Potkar

References 

Indian poetry
Literary education